The 1967–68 season of the European Cup Winners' Cup club football tournament was won by Milan following their final victory against Hamburg, the fourth West German finalist in four years. Milan beat defending champions Bayern Munich en route to the final.

First round

|}

First leg

Second leg

Milan won 6–2 on aggregate.

Aberdeen won 14–1 on aggregate.

Valencia won 8–2 on aggregate.

Steaua București won 4–1 on aggregate.

Tottenham Hotspur won 6–3 on aggregate.

Cardiff City won 3–1 on aggregate.

Second round

|}

First leg

Second leg

3–3 on aggregate; Milan won on away goals.

Valencia won 3–1 on aggregate.

4–4 on aggregate; Lyon won on away goals.

Quarter-finals

|}

1 Milan beat Standard Liège 2–0 in a play-off.

2 Hamburg beat Lyon 2–0 in a play-off.

3 Cardiff City beat Torpedo Moscow 1–0 in a play-off.

First leg

Second leg

2–2 on aggregate.

Play-offs

Hamburg won play-off 2–0.

Cardiff City won play-off 1–0.

Semi-finals

|}

First leg

Second leg

Milan won 2–0 on aggregate.

Hamburg won 4–3 on aggregate.

Final

See also
 1967–68 European Cup
 1967–68 Inter-Cities Fairs Cup

External links
 1967-68 competition at UEFA website
 Cup Winners' Cup results at Rec.Sport.Soccer Statistics Foundation
  Cup Winners Cup Seasons 1967-68 – results, protocols
 website Football Archive  1967–68 Cup Winners Cup 

3
UEFA Cup Winners' Cup seasons